Mokhtar Hashim (1 May 1942 – 18 November 2020) was a Malaysian politician who served as the Minister of Culture, Youth and Sports (1980–1983). He was convicted for the 1982 murder of a rival politician, Negeri Sembilan Assembly Speaker Taha Talib, but the sentence was commuted to life imprisonment. He was ultimately granted a royal pardon in 1991.

Election results

References

1942 births
2020 deaths
United Malays National Organisation politicians
Members of the Dewan Rakyat
Government ministers of Malaysia